A a post office was first established in Chicago on March 8, 1831, with Johnathan N. Baily, a fur trader, being appointed Chicago's first postmaster.

Chicago was long the hub of the Railway Mail Service of the United States. Chicago saw particularly large volumes of mail in the peak era of mail-order business by Chicago-based retailers Montgomery Ward and Sears.

Postmasters appointed before 1971
Until the establishment of the United States Postal Service in 1971, the president of the United States appointed local postmasters.

In the 19th century, many appointees of postal positions in the United States were patronage positions, with newspaper editors with close ties to the president's party often receiving postmastership positions.

Postmasters appointed after 1971

Officers in charge
The following individuals served as "officer in charge of the Chicago Post Office" during periods in which there was a vacancy in the position of postmaster of Chicago:

See also
Old Chicago Main Post Office

References